Scott Andrew Kamieniecki (born April 19, 1964) is an American former Major League Baseball (MLB) pitcher who played for the New York Yankees, Baltimore Orioles, Cleveland Indians, and Atlanta Braves between 1991 and 2000.

Biography
A native of Mount Clemens, Michigan, Kamieniecki played college baseball at the University of Michigan. In 1984, he played collegiate summer baseball for the Harwich Mariners of the Cape Cod Baseball League (CCBL). A league all-star, he posted a 4-1 record with a 2.14 ERA, striking out 54 batters in 67.1 innings. He was inducted into the CCBL Hall of Fame in 2011.

Kamieniecki currently resides in Clarkston, Michigan.  Youngest son Alan attends Michigan State University, and oldest son Matt attends Ball State University where he plays basketball for the Cardinals.

References

External links
 Baseball Reference
 Brosius - Kamieniecki Quandary

New York Yankees players
Baltimore Orioles players
Cleveland Indians players
Atlanta Braves players
Major League Baseball pitchers
Baseball players from Michigan
Michigan Wolverines baseball players
1964 births
Living people
People from Mount Clemens, Michigan
People from Clarkston, Michigan
American people of Polish descent
Harwich Mariners players
Sportspeople from Metro Detroit
Albany-Colonie Yankees players
Bowie Baysox players
Columbus Clippers players
Fort Lauderdale Yankees players
Frederick Keys players
Iowa Cubs players
Prince William Yankees players
Rochester Red Wings players
Tampa Yankees players